Hammarby IP (short for "Hammarby Idrottsplats", "Hammarby Sports Ground") also known as "Kanalplan", is a football stadium in Stockholm, Sweden. The current main tenant is the women's football team Hammarby IF.

The stadium was officially opened by Gustaf VI Adolf, at the time the crown prince of Sweden in 1915.

Renovation
Due to Hammarby winning promotion to Damallsvenskan in 2014 season, it was unclear if Hammarby IF DFF still would play in Kanalplan. The stadium didn't meet the requirements for the top-tier league because of "bad condition of the field and the surrounding area".

In October 2014, it was announced that Kanalplan is planned for renovation for the upcoming season.

Other uses
From the mid 1940s to 1969, the motorcycle speedway club Monarkerna raced at Hammarby IP.

References

External links 
Hammarby IP site at Stockholm.se 

Football venues in Sweden
Hammarby IF
Hammarby Fotboll (women)
Football venues in Stockholm
1915 establishments in Sweden
Sports venues completed in 1915
Speedway venues in Sweden